Mauricio (Garrido) Ramos (born February 2, 1992) is a Colombian professional baseball third baseman who is currently a free agent.

Career
He was signed by the Kansas City Royals at 18 years old as an amateur free agent in November 2010. In 2016, Ramos was a Texas League all-star and finished second in the league in hits and third in batting average. However, he never rose above Double-A in affiliated baseball. On November 6, 2017, Ramos elected free agency. On February 19, 2020, Ramos signed with the Evansville Otters of the Frontier League. On April 14, 2021, Ramos was released by the Otters.

International career
Ramos was selected to the roster for the Colombia national baseball team at the 2017 World Baseball Classic.

Personal life
, he lived in Idaho Falls, Idaho.

References

External links

1992 births
Living people
Arizona League Royals players
Baseball third basemen
Bravos de Margarita players
Colombian expatriate baseball players in Venezuela
Burlington Royals players
Colombian baseball players
Colombian expatriate baseball players in the United States
Dominican Summer League Royals players
Colombian expatriate baseball players in the Dominican Republic
Idaho Falls Chukars players
Lexington Legends players
Northwest Arkansas Naturals players
Surprise Saguaros players
Wilmington Blue Rocks players
Sugar Land Skeeters players
2017 World Baseball Classic players
Sportspeople from Cartagena, Colombia